Les Belleville is a commune in the Savoie department of southeastern France. The municipality was established on 1 January 2016 by the merger of the former communes of Saint-Martin-de-Belleville and Villarlurin. On 1 January 2019, the former commune Saint-Jean-de-Belleville was merged into Les Belleville.

Geography

Climate

Les Belleville has a humid continental climate (Köppen climate classification Dfb).

See also 
Communes of the Savoie department

References 

Communes of Savoie